Scedopla is a genus of moths of the family Noctuidae.

Species
Scedopla diffusa Sugi, 1959
Scedopla inouei Sugi, 1982
Scedopla regalis Butler, 1878
Scedopla umbrosa (Wileman, 1916)

References
Natural History Museum Lepidoptera genus database

Calpinae